David Donaldson Robertson (21 March 1869 – 13 September 1937) was a Scottish sportsman who represented Great Britain and Ireland at golf in the 1900 Summer Olympics, and also played international rugby for the Scotland.

Personal history
Robertson was born in Shawlands, Glasgow, Scotland to William Alexander Robertson, a wine merchant. He was educated at Haileybury School in Hertfordshire before entering the Glasgow Academy; he later studied at Glasgow University before matriculating to Christ's College, Cambridge in 1889. He received his BA in 1893 and was called to the Bar at Lincoln's Inn in 1895.

With the outbreak of the First World War, Robertson joined the Royal Navy Volunteer Reserve, Anti-Aircraft Division.

Robertson died aged 68 in Idstone, Berkshire, England.

Rugby career
Robertson first came to note as a rugby player when he represented Cambridge University in the 1892 Varsity match. The 1893 game was a huge disappointment after heavy rainfall turned the Queen's Club ground into mud. Although both teams came to the match with excellent reputations for exciting play, the game "degenerated into a scramble in the mud"; and the game ended in a nil-nil draw. While still representing Cambridge at club level, Robertson was selected Scotland for a rugby international against Wales as part of the 1893 Home Nations Championship. The Welsh used the four three-quarter tactic to great effect and Scotland were well beaten on their own ground, 9–0. The Scottish selectors acted angrily towards the back positions, making six changes. Robertson was one of those dropped, and never represented Scotland at rugby again.

Golf career

In 1900 he won the bronze medal in the men's competition in golf at the Olympics.

References

External links

 
 

Alumni of Christ's College, Cambridge
Alumni of the University of Glasgow
Amateur golfers
British Army personnel of World War I
Cambridge University R.U.F.C. players
Golfers at the 1900 Summer Olympics
Golfers from Glasgow
Medalists at the 1900 Summer Olympics
Olympic bronze medallists for Great Britain
Olympic golfers of Great Britain
Olympic medalists in golf
People educated at Haileybury and Imperial Service College
People educated at the Glasgow Academy
Royal Navy personnel of World War I
Rugby union players from Glasgow
Rugby union three-quarters
Scotland international rugby union players
Scottish male golfers
Scottish Olympic medallists
Scottish rugby union players
1869 births
1937 deaths